Extract, load, transform (ELT) is an alternative to extract, transform, load (ETL) used with data lake implementations. In contrast to ETL, in ELT models the data is not transformed on entry to the data lake, but stored in its original raw format. This enables faster loading times. However, ELT requires sufficient processing power within the data processing engine to carry out the transformation on demand, to return the results in a timely manner. Since the data is not processed on entry to the data lake, the query and schema do not need to be defined a priori (although often the schema will be available during load since many data sources are extracts from databases or similar structured data systems and hence have an associated schema). ELT is a data pipeline model.

Cloud data lake components

Common storage options 

 AWS
 Simple Storage Service (S3)
 Amazon RDS
 Azure
 Azure Blob Storage
 GCP
 Google Storage (GCS)

Querying 

 AWS
 Redshift Spectrum
 Athena
 EMR (Presto)
 Azure
 Azure Data Lake
 GCP
 BigQuery

References

External links
 Dull, Tamara, "The Data Lake Debate: Pro is Up First", smartdatacollective.com, March 20, 2015.
 ELT: Extract, Load, and Transform A Complete Guide | Astera Software

Data warehousing